Jiayou is a town of Lingyun County, Guangxi, China. , it administers the following 12 villages:
Jiayou Village
Anxiang Village
Yangli Village
Weiba Village
Zafu Village
Longhuai Village
Moxian Village
Shangsan Village
Dongha Village
Xiasan Village
Bailong Village
Shangyan Village

References

Towns of Guangxi
Administrative divisions of Lingyun County